This is a list of Slovenian football transfers for the 2022–23 winter transfer window. Only transfers featuring Slovenian PrvaLiga are listed.

Slovenian PrvaLiga

Note: Flags indicate national team as has been defined under FIFA eligibility rules. Players may hold more than one non-FIFA nationality.

Maribor

In:

Out:

Koper

In:

Out:

Olimpija Ljubljana

In:

Out:

Mura

In:

Out:

Bravo

In:

Out:

Radomlje

In:

Out:

Domžale

In:

Out:

Celje

In:

Out:

Tabor Sežana

In:

Out:

Gorica

In:

Out:

See also
 2022–23 Slovenian PrvaLiga

References

External links
 Official site of the NZS
 Official site of the Slovenian PrvaLiga

Slovenia
Transfers
2022-23